Anapsicomus is a genus of longhorn beetles of the subfamily Lamiinae.

 Anapsicomus aethroides Galileo & Martins, 1988
 Anapsicomus lampyroides (Bates, 1866)

References

Calliini